The following is a list of wars involving Iceland. Although modern Iceland does not maintain a standing army, navy nor air force; it maintains a militarised coast guard which is in charge of defending the country and has deployed a small peacekeeping force internationally on a few occasions. Iceland has never participated in a full-scale war or invasion and the constitution of Iceland has no mechanism to declare war. None of the Cod Wars meet any of the common thresholds for a conventional war and they may more accurately be described as militarised interstate disputes between Iceland and the United Kingdom.

Before the 15th century

Viking battles

Internal strifes

15th to 19th century

20th century

21st century

Peacekeeping

See also
Defence of Iceland
Iceland in World War II (invasion)
List of countries without armed forces
Military history of Iceland
Turkish Abductions

References

Wars
Iceland